The 22nd Annual Echo Awards were held on March 21, 2013, at the Palais am Berliner Funkturm in Berlin. The show was broadcast on Das Erste and was hosted for the first time by Schlager entertainer Helene Fischer. Nominations for all 27 award categories were announced on January 31, 2013.

Die Toten Hosen won the most number of awards during the ceremony, with four, including the Echo for Song of the Year for "Tage wie diese" and Album of the Year for Ballast der Republik. In addition, the band was awarded Best National Rock/Pop Group and Producers of the Year along with Vincent Sorg. Other multiple winners include: Cro, Unheilig, Lana Del Rey and host Helene Fischer with two awards each.

Performers
The following performed on the main telecast:

 Carla Bruni – "Mon Raymond"
 Cascada "Glorious"
 Cro – "Einmal um die Welt"
 Depeche Mode – "Heaven"
 Frida Gold – "Liebe ist meine Rebellion"
 David Garrett – "Viva la Vida"
 Helene Fischer – "Let Me Entertain You"
 Hurts – "Miracle"
 Lena – "Neon (Lonely People)"
 Peter Plate – "Wir beide sind Musik"
 Emeli Sandé – "Read All About It, Part III"
 Santiano & Andreas Gabalier – "Es gibt nur Wasser"
 Seeed – "Deine Zeit"
 Silly – "Deine Stärken"
 Hannes Wader & Die Toten Hosen – "Heute hier, morgen dort"

Winners and nominees

Awards 

The winners and nominees per category were (Winners are listed first and highlighted in boldface):

Artists with multiple nominations and awards

The following artists received multiple nominations:
Seven: Die Toten Hosen
Six: Cro
Five: Unheilig
Four: Santiano
Three: Die Ärzte, Seeed, Silbermond
Two: Mandy Capristo, Deichkind, Helene Fischer, Mrs. Greenbird, Max Herre, Kraftklub, Lena, Peter Maffay, Daniele Negroni, Of Monsters and Men, Ivy Quainoo, Lana Del Rey, Emeli Sandé, Xavas, Y’akoto

The following artists received multiple awards:
Four: Die Toten Hosen
Two: Cro, Unheilig, Lana Del Rey, Helene Fischer

Televised ratings 
In its original live television broadcast, the ceremony received an 11.4 share/rating among viewers aged 18–49 and was watched by 3.73 million people.

References

External links

2013 music awards
2013 in music
Echo Awards